Cambria Township is a township in Saline County, Kansas, United States.

Cambria Township was organized in 1878.

References

Townships in Saline County, Kansas
Townships in Kansas